The Chefs' Line is an Australian reality competitive cooking show. The series features four home cooks in each episode who compete against professional chefs in a studio kitchen. The challenge is to create their personal versions of a chosen dish from the week's featured cuisine. Dishes are then blind-tasted and judged by executive chef Dan Hong, food writer Melissa Leong, and chef Mark Olive. The contestants are eliminated until the week's winner is chosen. On the fifth night, Maeve O’Meara goes into the kitchen of the week's featured restaurant to uncover their culinary secrets.

See also

 List of Australian television series

References

External links
 

2010s Australian television series
2017 Australian television series debuts
2018 Australian television series endings
Australian cooking television series
Cooking competitions in Australia
English-language television shows
Special Broadcasting Service original programming
Television series by Eureka
Television shows set in Sydney